"Jubilee Street" is a song by the Australian alternative rock band Nick Cave and the Bad Seeds. It is the fourth track and second single from the band's fifteenth studio album, Push the Sky Away, and was released on 15 January 2013 on Bad Seed Ltd.

An accompanying music video directed by John Hillcoat and featuring an appearance by Ray Winstone, was released on 4 February 2013. It was nominated for Best Video at the ARIA Music Awards of 2013.

Track listing
Digital download
"Jubilee Street" (Cave, Ellis) – 6:35

Chart positions

References

2013 singles
2012 songs
Nick Cave songs
Song recordings produced by Nick Launay
Songs written by Nick Cave
Songs written by Warren Ellis (musician)